The Canada national under-19 cricket team represents the country of Canada in under-19 international cricket.

Canada has qualified for the Under-19 Cricket World Cup on eight occasions, the most of any associate member from the ICC Americas region.

History
Two Canadian players represented the ICC Associates XI at the inaugural 1988 Youth Cricket World Cup in Australia. Four Canadians represented the combined Americas XI at the 2000 Under-19 Cricket World Cup.

At the 2010 ICC Under-19 Cricket World Cup Canada finished in 11th position. They won two games in the competition, against Zimbabwe in the group stage and against Papua New Guinea in the play-off for 11th place. The victory against Zimbabwe is their only victory against a full member at the Under-19 World Cup.

The coach of Canada for the 2020 Under-19 Cricket World Cup in South Africa was Farouk Kirmani and the captain was Ashtan Deosammy.

Towards the end of the 2022 World Cup, the ICC confirmed that there were nine cases of COVID-19 within Canada's camp. Therefore, the team's remaining two matches were cancelled, with Scotland progressing to the 13th-place playoff match due to a superior net run rate. The Canadian team flew back home shortly after the ICC's statement.

Under-19 World Cup record

List of captains
Eight players have captained Canada in under-19 One Day International (ODI) matches.

Records
All records listed are for under-19 One Day International (ODI) matches only.

Team records

Highest totals
 300/7 (50 overs), v. , at Ibbies Oval, Potchefstroom, 30 January 2020
 265/8 (50 overs), v. , at Lincoln No. 3, Lincoln, 22 January 2018
 248/8 (50 overs), v. , at Tolerance Oval, Abu Dhabi, 16 February 2014
 240 (47.3 overs), v. , at ICC Academy No. 2, Dubai, 24 February 2014
 235 (46.4 overs), v. , at Conaree Sports Club, Basseterre, 15 January 2022

Lowest totals
 41 (28.4 overs), v. , at North Harbour Stadium, Auckland, 25 January 2002
 75 (27.1 overs), v. , at Sheikh Zayed Stadium, Abu Dhabi, 22 February 2014
 81 (31.1 overs), v. , at Shahid Kamruzzaman Stadium, Rajshahi, 17 February 2004
 85 (34.4 overs), v. , at Colin Maiden Park No. 2, Auckland, 1 February 2002
 85 (29.2 overs), v. , at Brian Lara Cricket Academy, Tarouba, 25 January 2022

Individual records

Most career runs
 427 – Arslan Khan (2016-2018)
 312 – Akash Gill (2016-2018)
 259 – Mihir Patel (2020-2022)
 219 – Nitish Kumar (2010-2014)
 197 – Yug Rao (2014)

Highest individual scores
 120 (115 balls) – Akash Gill, v. , at Lincoln No. 3, Lincoln, 22 January 2018
 101 (102 balls) – Nicholas Manohar, v. , at Ibbies Oval, Potchefstroom, 30 January 2020
 96 (105 balls) – Mihir Patel, v. , at Conaree Sports Club, Basseterre, 15 January 2022
 90 (105 balls) – Mihir Patel, v. , at Mangaung Oval, Bloemfontein, 18 January 2020
 90 (114 balls) – Usman Limbada, v. , at Village Green, Christchurch, 15 January 2010

Most career wickets
 16 – Akhil Kumar (2020)
 14 – Faisal Jamkhandi (2018)
 13 – Akash Gill (2016-2018)
 9 – Shaheed Keshvani (2004)
 8 – Nikhil Dutta (2014), Miraj Patel (2016)

Best bowling performances
 6/46 (10 overs) – Akhil Kumar, v. , at Ibbies Oval, Potchefstroom, 30 January 2020
 5/29 (10 overs) – Shaheed Keshvani, v. , at M. A. Aziz Stadium, Chittagong, 27 February 2004
 5/48 (8 overs) – Faisal Jamkhandi, v. , at Bert Sutcliffe Oval, Lincoln, 15 January 2018
 4/16 (4 overs) – Miraj Patel, v. , at Sheikh Kamal International Stadium, Cox's Bazar, 11 February 2016
 4/43 (8 overs) – Akash Gill, v. , at Bert Sutcliffe Oval, Lincoln, 18 January 2018

References

Under-19 cricket teams
International
Cricket